Kompetch Sitsarawatsuer (คมเพชร ศิษย์สารวัตรเสือ) is a Thai Muay Thai fighter.

Titles and accomplishments
Lumpinee Stadium
 2018 Lumpinee Stadium 112 lbs Champion
 2019 Lumpinee Stadium 118 lbs Champion
Professional Boxing Association of Thailand (PAT) 
 2017 Thailand 108 lbs Champion
Channel 7 Boxing Stadium
 2017 Channel 7 Stadium 108 lbs Champion
 2018 Channel 7 Stadium 112 lbs Champion
 2021 Channel 7 Stadium 126 lbs Champion

Awards
 2018 Sports Authority of Thailand Young Fighter of the Year

Fight record

|- style="background:#fbb;"
| 2023-03-12 || Loss ||align=left| Akihiro Kaneko || K-1 World GP 2023: K'Festa 6 || Tokyo, Japan || Decision (Majority) || 3 || 3:00
|-
! style=background:white colspan=9 |
|-

|-  style="background:#fbb"
| 2023-01-20|| Loss ||align=left| Prajanchai P.K.Saenchaimuaythaigym || ONE Friday Fights 1, Lumpinee Stadium || Bangkok, Thailand || Decision (Unanimous) || 3 || 5:00

|-  style="background:#cfc;"
| 2022-12-11 || Win ||align=left| Focus Adsanpatong || Chang MuayThai Kiatpetch Amarin Super Fight, Rajadamnern Stadium || Bangkok, Thailand || Decision || 5|| 3:00
|-  style="background:#cfc;"
| 2022-11-05 || Win ||align=left| Comeback TK.Yuttana || TorNamThai Kiatpetch TKO, World Siam Stadium || Bangkok, Thailand || Decision || 5||3:00
|-  style="background:#fbb"
| 2022-10-08 || Loss ||align=left| View Petchkoson ||  TorNamThai TKO Kiatpetch + Muay Thai Kiatpetch, World Siam Stadium  || Bangkok, Thailand || Decision  || 5 || 3:00
|-  style="text-align:center; background:#cfc;"
| 2022-09-11 || Win || align=left| Masashi Kumura ||  K-1 World GP 2022 Yokohamatsuri  || Yokohama, Japan || Decision (Split) || 3 || 3:00

|-  style="background:#cfc"
| 2022-08-13 || Win ||align=left| View Petchkoson || Ruamponkon Samui, Petchbuncha Stadium || Ko Samui, Thailand || Decision || 5 ||3:00
|- style="background:#cfc"
| 2022-06-20|| Win || align="left" | Tongnoi Lukbanyai || U-Muay RuamJaiKonRakMuayThai + Palangmai, Rajadamnern Stadium || Bangkok, Thailand || Decision || 5 || 3:00
|-  style="background:#fbb"
| 2022-05-22|| Loss ||align=left| View Petchkoson || Channel 7 Stadium || Bangkok, Thailand || Decision || 5 ||3:00 
|-
! style=background:white colspan=9 |
|-  style="background:#cfc"
| 2022-04-03|| Win||align=left| Ronachai Tor.Ramintra|| Channel 7 Stadium || Bangkok, Thailand || Decision || 5 || 3:00 
|-  style="background:#cfc"
| 2022-02-27||Win ||align=left| Samingdam Chor.Ajalaboon|| Channel 7 Stadium || Bangkok, Thailand || Decision || 5 ||3:00 
|-
! style=background:white colspan=9 |
|- style="background:#fbb;"
|2022-01-09|| Loss || align="left" | Ronachai Tor.Ramintra || Chang MuayThai Kiatpetch Amarin, Rajadamnern Stadium || Thailand|| Decision|| 5 ||3:00
|-  style="background:#cfc;"
| 2021-12-05|| Win ||align=left| Petchrungruang Por.Lakboon ||Channel 7 Boxing Stadium || Bangkok, Thailand ||Decision (Unanimous) || 5||3:00
|-
! style=background:white colspan=9 |
|-  style="background:#fbb;"
| 2021-11-07||Loss||align=left| Petchrungruang Por.Lakboon ||Channel 7 Boxing Stadium || Bangkok, Thailand ||Decision (Split) || 5||3:00
|-  style="background:#fbb;"
| 2021-09-28||Loss ||align=left| View Petchkoson || VAR Muay Charity Event for Muay Thai, Fonjangchonburi Stadium || Chonburi, Thailand || Decision  || 5||3:00
|-  style="background:#cfc;"
| 2021-03-27|| Win||align=left| Petch Or.Pimonsri ||  TKO Kiatpetch, Lumpinee Stadium || Bangkok, Thailand ||KO (Low Kicks)||2 ||
|-  style="background:#fbb;"
| 2020-12-08|| Loss ||align=left| Prajanchai P.K.Saenchaimuaythaigym || Lumpinee Stadium Birthday Show  || Bangkok, Thailand || Decision || 5|| 3:00
|-  style="background:#cfc;"
| 2020-10-05|| Win||align=left| Prajanchai P.K.Saenchaimuaythaigym ||  R1 UFA, World Siam Stadium || Bangkok, Thailand ||Decision ||5 ||3:00
|-  style="background:#cfc;"
| 2020-08-29|| Win ||align=left| Petchsamarn Sor.Samarngarment|| OrTorGor.3 Stadium || Nonthaburi, Thailand|| Decision ||5  || 3:00
|-  style="background:#fbb;"
| 2020-07-19|| Loss ||align=left| Ronachai Tor.Ramintra || Channel 7 Boxing Stadium || Bangkok, Thailand|| Decision || 5 || 3:00
|-  style="background:#CCFFCC;"
| 2020-02-17|| Win||align=left| Fahpennueng Por.Lakboon || Rajadamnern Stadium || Bangkok, Thailand|| KO || 5 ||
|-  style="background:#FFBBBB;"
| 2019-12-06 || Loss||align=left| Puenkon Diamond98 || Lumpinee Stadium || Bangkok, Thailand|| KO (Left High Kick)|| 2 ||  
|-
! style=background:white colspan=9 |
|-  style="background:#FFBBBB;"
| 2019-10-08 || Loss||align=left| Petchsamarn Sor.Samarngarment || Lumpinee Stadium || Bangkok, Thailand|| Decision || 5 || 3:00
|-  style="background:#FFBBBB;"
| 2019-09-06 || Loss||align=left| Ronachai Tor.Ramintra || Lumpinee Stadium || Bangkok, Thailand|| Decision || 5 || 3:00
|-  style="background:#c5d2ea;"
| 2019-07-02 || Draw||align=left| Ronachai Tor.Ramintra || Lumpinee Stadium || Bangkok, Thailand|| Decision || 5 || 3:00
|-  style="background:#CCFFCC;"
| 2019-05-10 || Win||align=left| Chokdee PK.Saenchaimuaythaigym || Lumpinee Stadium || Bangkok, Thailand|| Decision || 5 || 3:00 
|-
! style=background:white colspan=9 |
|-  style="background:#CCFFCC;"
| 2019-03-19 || Win||align=left| Watcharaphon P.K.Senchai || Lumpinee Stadium || Bangkok, Thailand|| Decision || 5 || 3:00
|-  style="background:#CCFFCC;"
| 2019-02-12 || Win||align=left| Jomhod Eminentair || Lumpinee Stadium || Bangkok, Thailand|| Decision || 5 || 3:00
|-  style="background:#CCFFCC;"
| 2019-12-25 || Win||align=left| Petchpailin Sitnumnoi	 || Lumpinee Stadium || Bangkok, Thailand|| Decision || 5 || 3:00
|-  style="background:#c5d2ea;"
| 2018-11-13|| Draw ||align=left| Phetsommai Sor.Sommai || Lumpinee Stadium ||Bangkok, Thailand || Decision || 5 || 3:00
|-  style="background:#CCFFCC;"
| 2018-10-14 || Win||align=left| Donkings Morbeskamala || Lumpinee Stadium || Bangkok, Thailand|| Decision || 5 || 3:00
|-  style="background:#FFBBBB;"
| 2018-09-07|| Loss||align=left| Phetsommai Sor.Sommai || Lumpinee Stadium ||Bangkok, Thailand || Decision || 5 || 3:00
|-  style="background:#CCFFCC;"
| 2018-06-24 || Win||align=left| Ongree Sor Dechaphan	 || Channel 7 Boxing Stadium || Bangkok, Thailand|| Decision || 5 || 3:00 
|-
! style=background:white colspan=9 |
|-  style="background:#FFBBBB;"
| 2018-05-01 || Loss||align=left| Kiew Parunchai || Lumpinee Stadium || Bangkok, Thailand|| Decision (Split) || 5 || 3:00 
|-
! style=background:white colspan=9 |
|-  style="background:#CCFFCC;"
| 2018-04-03 || Win||align=left| Ongree Sor Dechaphan || Lumpinee Stadium || Bangkok, Thailand|| Decision || 5 || 3:00 
|-
! style=background:white colspan=9 |
|-  style="background:#CCFFCC;"
| 2018-02-13 || Win||align=left| KoKo Paemeanburi || Lumpinee Stadium || Bangkok, Thailand|| Decision  || 5 || 3:00
|-  style="background:#CCFFCC;"
| 2017-12-08 || Win||align=left| KoKo Paemeanburi || Lumpinee Stadium || Bangkok, Thailand|| Decision  || 5 || 3:00 
|-
! style=background:white colspan=9 |
|-  style="background:#CCFFCC;"
| 2017-11-05 || Win||align=left| Nengern Lukjaomaesaivari || Channel 7 Boxing Stadium || Bangkok, Thailand|| Decision  || 5 || 3:00 
|-
! style=background:white colspan=9 |
|-  style="background:#CCFFCC;"
| 2017-09-08 || Win||align=left| Phetphanrit Por.Lakboon|| Lumpinee Stadium || Bangkok, Thailand|| Decision  || 5 || 3:00
|-  style="background:#CCFFCC;"
| 2017-07-26 || Win||align=left| Chaiyo PetchyindeeAcademy|| Lumpinee Stadium || Bangkok, Thailand|| Decision  || 5 || 3:00
|-  style="background:#CCFFCC;"
| 2017-06-20 || Win||align=left| Domthong Lukjaoporrongtom|| Lumpinee Stadium || Bangkok, Thailand|| Decision  || 5 || 3:00
|-  style="background:#CCFFCC;"
| 2017-05-05 || Win||align=left| Yodpayak Sor.Jor.Lekmuangnont || Lumpinee Stadium || Bangkok, Thailand|| Decision  || 5 || 3:00
|-  style="background:#CCFFCC;"
| 2017-03-03 || Win||align=left| Panphetlek Kiatjaroenchai || Lumpinee Stadium || Bangkok, Thailand|| Decision  || 5 || 3:00
|-  style="background:#CCFFCC;"
| 2016-12-09 || Win||align=left| Saksri Kiatmoo9 || Lumpinee Stadium || Bangkok, Thailand|| KO || 4 ||
|-  style="background:#CCFFCC;"
| 2016-11-15 || Win||align=left| Kaduklek Kor.Glomgieow || Lumpinee Stadium || Bangkok, Thailand|| Decision  || 5 || 3:00
|-  style="background:#CCFFCC;"
| 2016-09-09 || Win||align=left| Kompai Sor.Jullasen || Lumpinee Stadium || Bangkok, Thailand|| Decision  || 5 || 3:00
|-  style="background:#CCFFCC;"
| 2016-08-02 || Win||align=left| Kompai Sor.Jullasen || Lumpinee Stadium || Bangkok, Thailand|| Decision  || 5 || 3:00
|-  style="background:#FFBBBB;"
| 2016-06-28 || Loss||align=left| Kampanath Por.Lakboon || Lumpinee Stadium || Bangkok, Thailand|| Decision  || 5 || 3:00
|-  style="background:#CCFFCC;"
| 2016-05-31 || Win||align=left| Kaduklek Kor.Glomgieow || Lumpinee Stadium || Bangkok, Thailand|| Decision  || 5 || 3:00
|-  style="background:#c5d2ea;"
| 2016-04-22 || Draw||align=left| Kaduklek Kor.Glomgieow || Lumpinee Stadium || Bangkok, Thailand|| Decision  || 5 || 3:00
|-  style="background:#FFBBBB;"
| 2016-03-29 || Loss||align=left| Kaduklek Kor.Glomgieow || Lumpinee Stadium || Bangkok, Thailand|| Decision  || 5 || 3:00
|-  style="background:#CCFFCC;"
| 2016-01-24 || Win||align=left| Bangklanoi Mor.Ratanabandit || Lumpinee Stadium || Bangkok, Thailand|| Decision  || 5 || 3:00
|-  style="background:#FFBBBB;"
| 2015-11-14 || Loss ||align=left| Superod Nopparat || Lumpinee Stadium || Bangkok, Thailand|| KO || 4 ||
|-  style="background:#FFBBBB;"
| 2015-04-14 || Loss ||align=left| Padetsuk Chor.Patcharaphon || Lumpinee Stadium || Bangkok, Thailand|| Decision  || 5 || 3:00
|-  style="background:#CCFFCC;"
| 2015-03-03 || Win ||align=left| Phetnara Sor.Dechaphan || Lumpinee Stadium || Bangkok, Thailand|| Decision  || 5 || 3:00
|-  style="background:#CCFFCC;"
| 2015-01-30 || Win ||align=left| Yangdam Soonkilahuafai || Lumpinee Stadium || Bangkok, Thailand|| KO|| 4 ||
|-  style="background:#CCFFCC;"
| 2014-12-30 || Win ||align=left| Taleyngern Poraortaleybangsalay || Lumpinee Stadium || Bangkok, Thailand|| Decision  || 5 || 3:00
|-  style="background:#FFBBBB;"
| 2014-10-14 || Loss||align=left| Wuttichai Sitnumnoi || Lumpinee Stadium || Bangkok, Thailand|| Decision  || 5 || 3:00 
|-
| colspan=9 | Legend:

References

Kompetch Sitsarawatsuer
ONE Championship kickboxers 
Living people
2000 births
Kompetch Sitsarawatsuer